The Osen is a river in Bezhetsky District of Tver Oblast in Russia. It is a major right tributary of the Mologa.

The source of the Osen is located in Tver Oblast, close to the village of Pereuz. The Osen flows southwest and joins the Mologa at the village of Yeski.

Despite the short length, the Osen has a rather big drainage area. It includes almost all of Molokovsky District, the southern half of Sandovsky District, the northern and the western parts of Bezhetsky District, and the southern half of Krasnokholmsky District, as well as minor areas in Vesyegonsky and Sonkovsky Districts. The town of Krasny Kholm and the urban-type settlement of Molokovo lie in the drainage basin of the Osen.

References

Rivers of Tver Oblast